Joubert's Pass, is a mountain pass in the Senqu Local Municipality area in the Eastern Cape province of South Africa. It is a gravel road, has a remarkable maximum gradient of 1:6, an elevation of 2236m above sea level at the highest point and is possibly the fourth highest mountain pass in South Africa.  The three higher mountain passes are also situated in the Senqu Municipal area and they are Naude's Neck Pass at 2590m, Carlislehoekspruit Pass at 2517m and Volenteershoek Pass at 2381m above sea level.  Close on the heels of Joubert's pass, is Baster Voetslaan Pass at an elevation of 2235m, Lundean's Neck Pass at 2165m, Otto Du Plessis Pass at 2114m and Barkly Pass at 2020m.  These 8 passes, of which 5 are possibly the highest in South Africa, make up the well known “8 Passes Challenge” of the North Eastern Cape.  (Elevation of these passes supplied by Ivan Hansen, Land Surveyor from Queenstown.)

Before the existence of Joubert's pass, farmers on the other side of Witteberg had to take a long detour to get to Lady Grey.  A survey was done for the construction of a road from Lady Grey Nek to cross the mountain via the farm Burnet to Gairtney.  It was estimated that such a road would cost at least between five and six thousand pounds.  The route travelled today (Joubert's pass) was considered an impassable one – only fit for baboons.

About 40 years after the survey, farmers from the other side of the mountain decided that enough was enough and took the matter into their own hands. Seven farmers of which five had the surname Joubert took up their implements and proceeded to construct a wagon road as they saw fit.  The others were Stephenson and Cloete.  This passage through the mountains was built using only manual labour.  The most difficult part of the road, a length of six miles, had been constructed for the sum of £1156 10s and a further six miles or so had been made for £50.  The enterprise of this syndicate would take some beating.  Helvellyn, once fifty miles by road from Lady Grey, is now only seven, Ossa fifteen instead of 35, and other farms in proportion.  They ended up with one of the highest mountain passes in South Africa.

The opening ceremony took place on 17 December 1914.  This was a red letter day for Lady Grey.  A procession of spiders, carts and buggies started from the Central Hotel at 8:10 and they reached the summit in a little over an hour and a half. The ladies were exceedingly hospitable and provided good things in such quantities that the guests' powers were unequal to the occasion, consequently much of the supplies had to be carried home again.  At least 80 Ladies and Gentlemen were present. The Mayor, Mr. Lilford formally opened the road under the name of “Joubert's Pass.”  The stone tablet on the top of the pass credits five Jouberts: Gideon (Sr.), Daniel Francois, Christiaan de Wet, Gideon (Jr.) and Johannes Marthinus Joubert, plus George Friedrich Stephenson and Cornelius Willem Cloete. The initials MP at the bottom stand for Moos Pieterse, who also carved many of the headstones in the old cemetery in Lady Grey.  (Information about the opening ceremony obtained from Northern Post 20 Dec. 1914)

Mountain passes of the Eastern Cape